James Alexander Joseph Christy (12 December 1904 – 1 February 1971) was a South African cricketer who played in ten Test matches from 1929 to 1931–32.

Christy was a right-handed batsman often used as an opener and a right-arm medium-pace bowler, though he bowled less as he got older and almost not at all in Tests. He played in South African domestic cricket for Transvaal from 1925–26 to 1929–30, toured England, Australia and New Zealand with the South African team, and then had two seasons playing for Queensland in Australian domestic cricket.

References

External links

1904 births
1971 deaths
Gauteng cricketers
Queensland cricketers
South Africa Test cricketers